"Leave Before You Love Me" is a song by American record producer Marshmello and American group Jonas Brothers. It was released through Republic Records and Joytime Collective as a single on May 21, 2021. Produced by Marshmello and co-produced by Alesso, Digital Farm Animals, and Heavy Mellow, the producers wrote the song alongside Richard Boardman and Pablo Bowman of the songwriting collective the Six, Phil Plested, and William Vaughan. Christian Arnold, David Martin and Geoff Morrow of the band Butterscotch are also credited as songwriters, due to an interpolation of their song "Can't Smile Without You" in the chorus of "Leave Before You Love Me". Programming was solely handled by Marshmello and mixing and mastering was handled by Manny Marroquin. Of the Jonas Brothers' members individual contributions to the song, brothers Nick and Joe share vocals and brother Kevin plays guitar and background vocals. The song serves as the Jonas Brothers' first release of 2021.

Background
The song is a "sweet hooky pop ballad" that features "handclaps, a groove and the type of vibe that should break hearts all over the globe". The song was announced on May 20, 2021, one day prior to the release of the song, in which a snippet of the song would be able to be heard if the song is pre-saved.

A lyric video was published to the Jonas Brothers YouTube channel on the same day as its release.

Music video 
The official music video of the song, directed by Christian Breslauer was released to Marshmello's YouTube channel on May 24, 2021. He and the Jonas Brothers perform in a subway and on a roof at night. The visuals open with Nick from the brother band sitting alone on a subway train before he joins his bandmates/brothers and Marshmello on the subway platform and later on a roof. He and his older brother Joe sing about regret and moving on before further heartbreak ensues.

Live performances
Marshmello and the Jonas Brothers performed the song at the 2021 Billboard Music Awards on May 23, 2021, two days after the song's release. The group also performed "Sucker", "Only Human", "Remember This", and "What a Man Gotta Do".

The Jonas Brothers performed the song at AT&T Stadium in Arlington, Texas, on November 24, 2022—American Thanksgiving Day—at the halftime of the Dallas Cowboys’ NFL Thanksgiving game against the New York Giants, alongside other songs of theirs.

Charts

Weekly charts

Year-end charts

Certifications

Release history

References

2021 songs
2021 singles
2020s ballads
Pop ballads
Marshmello songs
Jonas Brothers songs
Songs written by Marshmello
Songs written by Alesso
Songs written by Digital Farm Animals
Songs written by Geoff Morrow
Songs written by Richard Boardman
Songs written by Pablo Bowman
Song recordings produced by Digital Farm Animals
Republic Records singles